Villaviciosa may refer to:

 Villaviciosa, Abra,  a municipality in Abra province, Philippines
 Villaviciosa, Asturias, a municipality in the autonomous community of Asturias, Spain
 Villaviciosa de Córdoba, a municipality in the province of Córdoba, Spain
 Villaviciosa de Odón, a municipality in the autonomous community of Madrid, Spain